Biju Babu is a 2019 Indian Odia-language film written and directed by Vishal Mourya and Devi Prasad Lenka and produced by Nila Madhab Panda. It stars Anubhav Mohanty in the lead role. It is the first Odia film produced by Panda.

Mourya claimed it to be the most expensive Odia film at the time. Its first motion poster was released on International Mother Tongue Day. It was released on Odisha Day on 29 March 2019.

It is not a biopic of Biju Patnaik (the former Chief Minister of Odisha) as was widely rumored.

Synopsis
Anubhav Mohanty fights with fake news and is inspired by Biju Pattanaik.

Cast 
 Anubhav Mohanty
 Supriya Nayak
 Chittaranjan Tripathy
 Ashrumochan Mohanty
 Prangyan Khuntia

Music 

Music composed by Prem Anand. The soundtracks has been released by Siddharth Music.

References

External links

2010s Odia-language films